Multithreading may refer to:

 Multithreading (computer architecture), in computer hardware
 Multithreading (software), in computer software